Big Creek Township may refer to:

Arkansas
 Big Creek Township, Craighead County, Arkansas, in Craighead County, Arkansas
 Big Creek Township, Fulton County, Arkansas, in Fulton County, Arkansas
 Big Creek Township, Hot Spring County, Arkansas, in Hot Spring County, Arkansas
 Big Creek Township, Lee County, Arkansas, in Lee County, Arkansas
 Big Creek Township, Newton County, Arkansas, in Newton County, Arkansas
 Big Creek Township, Phillips County, Arkansas, in Phillips County, Arkansas
 Big Creek Township, Sebastian County, Arkansas, in Sebastian County, Arkansas
 Big Creek Township, Sharp County, Arkansas, in Sharp County, Arkansas
 Big Creek Township, White County, Arkansas, in White County, Arkansas

Indiana
 Big Creek Township, White County, Indiana

Iowa
 Big Creek Township, Black Hawk County, Iowa

Kansas
 Big Creek Township, Ellis County, Kansas
 Big Creek Township, Neosho County, Kansas, in Neosho County, Kansas
 Big Creek Township, Russell County, Kansas

Michigan
 Big Creek Township, Michigan

Missouri
 Big Creek Township, Cass County, Missouri
 Big Creek Township, Henry County, Missouri
 Big Creek Township, Ozark County, Missouri
 Big Creek Township, Taney County, Missouri, in Taney County, Missouri
 Big Creek Township, Madison County, Missouri

North Carolina
 Big Creek Township, Stokes County, North Carolina

Township name disambiguation pages